Events in the year 1717 in Norway.

Incumbents
Monarch: Frederick IV

Events
Seminarium Lapponicum is established in Trondheim, a school for preparing teachers to teach in Sami language.
24 December - HDMS Lossen is wrecked during the Christmas storm of 1717, outside the island Vesterøy in Hvaler.

Arts and literature

Births

Full date unknown
Jens Schanche, postmaster (died 1787).

Deaths

See also

References